Johan Karlsson (born 6 April 1975) is a retired Swedish footballer who played as a defender. His last club was IF Elfsborg.

References

External links
  

1975 births
Living people
Swedish footballers
Association football defenders
Allsvenskan players
Åtvidabergs FF players
IF Elfsborg players